Soulfly is the debut album by American heavy metal band Soulfly, released on April 21, 1998, through Roadrunner Records. The record was released in memory of frontman Max Cavalera's deceased stepson and was the first album featuring Cavalera since leaving Sepultura two years prior. Both CDs have the message In Loving Memory Dana printed across them. The album has been certified gold by the RIAA.

Album information
The record features many guests, including members of Fear Factory, Limp Bizkit, Cypress Hill, Deftones, and Dub War.

"The Song Remains Insane" is pieced together by two other songs, opening with a cover of "Caos" by Ratos de Porão and secondly a brief reckless hardcore rendition of "Attitude" by Sepultura. "Umbabarauma" is a cover of a 1976 song by Brazilian musician Jorge Ben Jor, which originally featured on his album África Brasil.

The breakdown riff in "Tribe" originated during Max's time still in Sepultura - most likely created during on-the-road demo jams during the Roots tour though evidently never recorded in any complete demo form. As such, the riff was also used by Sepultura members Andreas Kisser and Igor Cavalera as the main riff to 'Walkman' during their scoring of the movie No Coracao Dos Deuses, recorded the same year as Soulfly's 'Tribe'.

In 2008, speaking to Kerrang!, Max Cavalera remembered:It was so hard to start over, having been in Sepultura for so long. In fact, it was harder getting Soulfly going than it was getting Sepultura started. Coming into a whole new situation underneath the shadow of Roots was a huge challenge for me, and most people thought I was nuts. Plus, we made a conscious effort not to sound like Sepultura. My choice of musicians took me away from straight metal and into a vibe that embraced a lot more, while still being heavy. Part of the magic was working with some of my all-time favourite Brazilian musicians and that really pushed me to write some great and some very different sounding music. Eye For an Eye is still my favourite, man, and I also like Tribe. That's like an anthem for all metalheads.

Track listing

Personnel

Soulfly
 Max Cavalera – lead vocals, rhythm guitar, berimbau on "Bleed" and "Tribe", backing vocals on "Bumba" and "Umbabarauma", sitar on "First Commandment" and "Soulfly", talk box on "No Hope = No Fear", agogô on "Fire", chains on "Prejudice"
 Jackson Bandeira (Lúcio Maia) – lead guitar, backing vocals on "Bumba" and "Umbabarauma", zabumba on "Fire"
 Marcello D. Rapp – bass, acoustic bass on "Soulfly", double bass on "First Commandment", backing vocals on "Bumba" and "Umbabarauma"
 Roy "Rata" Mayorga – drums, tambora on "Eye for an Eye", backing vocals on "Bumba" and "Umbabarauma", percussion on "Soulfly", "No" and "Quilombo (Zumbi Dub Mix)"

Additional musicians
 Dino Cazares – rhythm guitar on "Eye for an Eye"
 Burton C. Bell – backing vocals on "Eye for an Eye"
 DJ Lethal – turntables on "Bleed" and "Quilombo"
 Fred Durst – vocals on "Bleed"
 Gilmar Bolla Oito – tambora on "Eye for an Eye", "Tribe", "Bumba", "Bumbklaatt", "Umbabarauma", "Quilombo" and "Prejudice", percussion on "Soulfly", backing vocals on "Bumba" and "Umbabarauma", triangle on "Fire"
 Jorge Du Peixe – tambora on "Eye for an Eye", "Tribe", "Bumba", "Bumbklaatt", "Umbabarauma", "Quilombo" and "Prejudice", percussion on "Soulfly", backing vocals on "Bumba" and "Umbabarauma", chocalho on "Fire"
 Benji Webbe – vocals on "Quilombo" and "Prejudice", chains on "Prejudice", backing vocals on "Bumba"
 Chuck Johnson – backing vocals on "Bumba" and "Umbabarauma", percussion on "Soulfly" and "Karmageddon"
 Eric Bobo – backing vocals on "Bumba" and "Umbabarauma", percussion on "Umbabarauma"
 Los Hooligans – lead and backing vocals on "Bumba", backing vocals on "Umbabarauma"
 Mario Caldato Jr. – backing vocals on "Bumba" and "Umbabarauma"
 Paul Booth – backing vocals on "Bumba" and "Umbabarauma"
 Rob Agnello – backing vocals on "Bumba" and "Umbabarauma"
 Ross Robinson – backing vocals on "Bumba" and "Umbabarauma", percussion on "Soulfly"
 Chino Moreno – vocals on "First Commandment"
 Zyon Cavalera – "You Think You All Good" voice on "Bumbklaatt"
 Christian Olde Wolbers – double bass on "No"
 Chris Flam – additional programming on "Tribe (Fuck Shit Up Mix)"
 Logan Mader – lead guitar on live tracks
 Ritchie Cavalera – vocals on "Bleed (Live)"
 Dayjah – vocals on "Soulfly (Eternal Spirit Mix)"

Production
 Ross Robinson – production, mixing on "Soulfly", "Quilombo", "Cangaceiro", "Ain't No Feeble Bastard" and "The Possibility of Life's Destruction"
 Mario Caldato Jr. – co-production on "Bumba" and "Umbabarauma"
 Andy Wallace – mixing
 George Marino – mastering
 Richard Kaplan – engineering, additional production
 Chuck Johnson – engineering
 Rob Agnello – engineering
 Steve Sisco – Assistant mixing
 Anders Dohn – production on live tracks except "Eye for an Eye (Live at Indigo Ranch)"
 Jacob Langkilde – engineering on live tracks except "Eye for an Eye (Live at Indigo Ranch)"
 Jan Sneum – executive production on live tracks except "Eye for an Eye (Live at Indigo Ranch)"
 Soulfly – production on "Eye for an Eye (Live at Indigo Ranch)"
 Roy Moyorga – remixing and additional production on "Tribe (Fuck Shit Up Mix)", mixing on "Eye for an Eye (Live at Indigo Ranch)"
 Chris Flam – engineering on "Tribe (Fuck Shit Up Mix)"
 The Rootsman – remixing and additional production on "Quilombo (Extreme Ragga Dub Mix)", "Quilombo (Zumbi Dub Mix)" and "Soulfly (Eternal Spirit Mix)"
 Junkie XL – remixing and additional production on "Umbabarauma (World Cup Mix)"
 Josh Abraham – remixing and additional production on "Tribe (Tribal Terrorism Mix)"
 Brian Virtue – mixing on "Tribe (Tribal Terrorism Mix)"
 Jason Corsaro – remixing and additional production on "Umbabarauma (Brasil '70 Mix)"
 Ted Jensen – mastering 1999 reissue bonus CD

Artwork
 Jo Kirchherr – cover photo
 Glen LaFerman and Christy Priske – photography
 Mike Roper and Paul Stottler – label design
 Pawn Shop Press – art direction, design

Charts

Certifications

References

 

Soulfly albums
1998 debut albums
Roadrunner Records albums
Albums produced by Ross Robinson